Shiels is the name of:

 Amy Shiels (born 1991), actress
 Brush Shiels (born 1945), musician
 Clark Shiels (born 1989), Welsh wheelchair curler
 Dean Shiels (born 1985), footballer 
 Dennis Shiels (born 1938), footballer 
 Drummond Shiels (1881–1953), politician
 George Shiels (1881–1949), dramatist 
 George F. Shiels (1863–1943), surgeon 
 Jackie Shiels (born 1985), rugby union player
 Karl Shiels (1971–2019), Irish actor
 Kenny Shiels (born 1956), football player and manager
 Liam Shiels (born 1991), footballer 
 Meredith Shiels, American cancer epidemiologist 
 Michael Patrick Shiels, radio host
 Paul Shiels (born 1989), hurler 
 Peter Shiels (born 1973), rugby league footballer 
 Robert Shiels (died 1753), literary compiler
 Ted Shiels (1908–1987), Australian rules footballer 
 Tony "Doc" Shiels (born 1938), artist and magician
 William Shiels (1848–1904), politician
 William Shiels (artist) (1783-1857), Artist

See also
 Shiel, surname
 Shields (surname)
 Shiels Jewellers, Australian company
 Thomas Shiels House, Dallas, Texas